Atthaphan Phunsawat (born 4 October 1993), also known as Gun, is a Thai actor and host. He is best known for his role as Punn in The Gifted (2018), Third in Theory of Love (2019), Black/White in Not Me (2021–2022)

Early life and education 
Atthaphan was born on 4 October 1993 in Bangkok, Thailand. He used to study Business Administration at the University of Bangkok but now he is studying Political Science at Ramkhamhaeng University.

Career 
Source:

At a young age, Atthaphan entered the entertainment industry supported by his mother, who knew about her son's ambitions: 'Mommy, Gun wants to be on TV', he reminisced in an interview. With her support, he auditioned for film companies and became the first winner of The Boy Model Competition 2003.

His first main role came in 2004's 'Gomin', one of his more popular works in Thailand. This folklore soap-opera was very popular when it aired and pushed Gun to become a known child actor at the age of nine to ten. Since then, he has been continuously active in the industry—to a greater or lesser extent—taking part in a pile of Channel 7 and Channel 3's TV dramas throughout his childhood.

Particularly, it was in the field of cinema that Atthaphan started to stand out in the drama genre, where he was noticed in alternative productions such as Kongkiat Khomsiri's Slice (2009), a Thai thriller where a teenage Gun surprised audiences by portraying an abused child, subsequently being nominated for the Suphannahong National Film Awards and to win Best Supporting Actor at the 7th Chalerm Thai Awards (2010).

Another production that earned him prestige for his acting prowess was undoubtedly Anucha Boonyawatana's film 'The Blue Hour' (2015), whose role of Tam won him a nomination of Best Actor at Thai Film Directors Association Awards and another at Suphannahong National Film Awards (2016), additionally winning Performance of the Year at the Bioscope Awards 2015 alongside his co-star Oabnithi Wiwattanawarang (Oab).

After signing with GMMTV in 2016, Gun gained prominence for playing Rome in 'Senior Secret Love: Puppy Honey' (2016) and its respective sequel alongside Jumpol Adulkittiporn. The strong chemistry between the two led them to host web programs, to release the single 'Too Cute To Handle' and starring roles in the romantic drama 'Theory of Love' (2019). Together, Off and Gun received numerous Best Couple Awards from award-giving bodies such as Maya Awards (2018, 2019) and LINE TV Awards (2019, 2020).

Atthaphan also found independent acclaim for his performance as Punn in 'The Gifted' (2018), for which he won Best Fight Scene at the LINE TV Awards (2019) and Best Actor in a Supporting Role at the 24th Asian Television Awards (2020).

Outside his acting career, Gun owns the clothing brand GENTE and co-owns another clothing brand Too Cute To Be Cool with actresses Alice Tsoi and Nichaphat Chatchaipholrat (Pearwah).

Filmography

Film

Television

Music video appearances

Discography

Singles

Awards and nominations

References

External links 
 

 
 

1993 births
Living people
Atthaphan Phunsawat
Atthaphan Phunsawat
Atthaphan Phunsawat
Atthaphan Phunsawat
Atthaphan Phunsawat